Jane A. Warren (born September 8, 1950) is a former Democratic member of the Wyoming House of Representatives, representing the 13th district from 2000 to 2008.

External links
Project Vote Smart - Representative Jane Warren (WY) profile
Follow the Money - Jane Warren
2006 2004 2002 2000 1996 campaign contributions

Democratic Party members of the Wyoming House of Representatives
1950 births
Living people
Women state legislators in Wyoming
People from Torrington, Wyoming
21st-century American women